Max steel Steel's Turbo Missions is a series of one-minute clips produced in partnership by Mattel, Sony Pictures Family Entertainment and Mainframe Entertainment (now Rainmaker Animation) which premiered in the first half of 2008 in Latin America. Each clip usually presents Max challenging one of his enemies. There's no moral lessons to be learned or advertising as usually happens in this kind of TV commercials. The main purpose of the Turbo Mission series is to keep Max's presence alive among his fans, and slowly reintroduce previous plots and situations from the series and movies. The clips are not intended to be viewed in a specific order, and are independent of each other. You don't need to watch one in particular to understand others. Also the chronology of the events depicted varies from clip to clip. Some shows present situations, while others are denoted to be memories or flashbacks.

Turbo Missions are also used to retcon the story, and give additional hints and backgrounds of the Max Steel character often as tie-in with direct to DVD movies. for example, in the movie Dark Rival it is mentioned that Troy Winter and Max are old rivals with no further explanations, but many Turbo Missions episodes show several past confrontations between Max and Troy, providing a more wide and credible background for both characters. A curious thing to note is that despite it is stated several times in Dark Rival that Max never defeated Troy in the Extreme Sports Circuit, he usually surpasses him in Turbo Missions. Hence, the reason why Troy hates Max so much in the movie. Also Max fights several Psycho-robots, but it is not clear if these fights in particular are present or past, specially 'cause in this mini series Max always wears his newest Adrenalink uniform and the '09 Going Turbo Upgrade, even when the events depicted in the flashback episodes are supposed to happen years before this date.

For merchandising reasons, the complete season one episodes were randomly packed with the 2008 Bio Crisis DVD as an extra bonus. Other versions of this same DVD contained a Barbie My Scene movie instead. The external package of Bio Crisis does not mention anything about bonus content, or which one is included, but the My Scene version was initially intended to be a Wal-Mart exclusive.

In 2011, the Max Steel website was remade, giving it a new, fresh look. Episodes of "Turbo Missions" could be found there, however, they carried a new name, "N-Tek Adventures." These were lost when the website was updated for the 2013 reboot.

Turbo Missions characters 
Due to copyright issues with the studios that originally participated in the initial release of Max Steel, most of the series support characters make no appearance at all in Turbo Missions and several mayor character from the original 2000 TV series and later Direct to DVD movies were gradually removed from Max Steel continuity with no further explanation to the audience. Jefferson (Max's adoptive father) made a last final appearance stating "he was on a very well deserved vacation for a long time". Kat, Max's best friend and the only female on Max Steel movies simply never returned after Bio Crisis direct to DVD movie and only made a cameo appearance in Turbo Missions. To substitute them, new characters were introduced initially in several movies en eventually become mayor support characters on Turbo missions and upcoming series. Elementor and ToxZon remain as the main antagonists, but with a twist, while Tox takes the brains role, plotting and directing the battle, Elementor becomes mostly a paw. They are later joined by Makino To create a super villain organisation.

N-Tek 

 Max Steel (voiced by Christian Campbell from 2000–2008, Matthew Kaminsky in two episodes in 2001 Mark Hildreth in N-Tek Adventures) - Note in Turbo Mission, Max Steel has no secret identity as opposite to the 2000 TV series. He's a professional extreme sports star, similar as Tony Hawk, but also works for his adoptive father, Jefferson Smith, leader of N-Tek; which supplies such equipment. When younger, Max suffered an accident when he was doused with Nanoprobes while battling Psycho. These probes gave him the enhanced senses, ability to alter his appearance, turn invisible (dubbed, "Stealth mode!") and become superhumanly-strong, agile, and fast (dubbed, "Going turbo!"), and to heal faster than a normal human being, but due to them integrating with his organic systems, he requires periodic doses of transphasic energy to survive or the probes will essentially starve to death and kill him.
 Cytro - This battle android is a mechanic version of Dr. Jekyll & Mister Hyde. Created by Doctor Grigor Rendell, Cytro's directives states he must destroy N-Tek, but as a result of a major battle damage, his programming fails and sees Max Steel as a friend instead. A curious thing to note, no matter if he is evil or good, his voice and attitude are more of an attentive and reflexive butler than a berserk warrior. Cytro's robotic body is expendable, and he cannot really be destroyed as long as a backup of his programming exists. The program which contains his personality just needs to be inserted into a new cybernetic body. Cytro is not just a tool. He can learn and take decisions on his own, despite his programming, and eventually develops a strange sense of humor: makes a human-like pose and then questions the purposes and utility of such behavior, which he finds pretty much useless. As long the series progresses, he became Max's crime fighting partner.
 Dr. Roberto Martinez (voiced by Jacob Vargas from 2000–2002, Alessandro Juliani in “Endangered Species”) - A technical genius in his late teen years. Best known as 'Berto (a diminutive of his name), he is the main expert on Nano-Tek Max, the microscopic machines which gave Max Steel his superhuman abilities. 'Berto is usually based at the HQ of the secret intelligence service N-Tek where he monitors Max's missions via a computer screen, but he also often takes a more active part in the missions himself. He has family in Colombia, although how many relatives is unknown. From the moment they met, he and Josh became very close: Josh would call Roberto "Bro", who would respond with the Spanish version, "Hermano".
 Faron "Forge" Ferrus - Very little is known about N-Tek's field commander. He takes the place of Jefferson Smith, with a bossy, rude and secretive attitude. Forge insists the mission always comes first, no questions, no doubts, no more information than the strictly amount needed to complete the task. Forge's character often collides with Max's free spirit, but in the end, both knows how to make a successful teamwork. While Forge's abilities have not been fully revealed yet, it is hinted that he can challenge Max with no major effort.
 "Jet" Ferrus - The reckless and assertive daughter of Forge, she takes the place of Kat as N-Tek field operative and female counterpart of Max. Same as Max, has issues with his father's passion for rules and often acts on her own, directly disobeying him. At the same time, she shows no respect for Max position in the group, and sees no reason to teamwork with him.

Enemies 
 Elementor (voiced by Scott McNeil) - Probably the most versatile of all Max's enemies, Elementor originally started just as an invincible Bio-Con animal who went mad. The reptile-bird-like creature enhances his natural abilities with the use of different isotopes which grants him the capacity to mimic different basic elements. Elementor can transform himself into a mass of rock (earth) radiation, bronze, shard, ray, nect, manganese, hydro spear, blue, granite, silver, corpse, cloud, cement, snow, hail, sleet, plastic, dust, smoke, medial, chain, pure adamantium, diamond, blaring sound, shock, hurricane, toxic air, glass, storm, wood, darkness, wave, rubber, stone, light, fog(mist), iron, gold, rust, silver, berg, curtain, titanium, flap, energy, porcelain, mud, lighting, electricity, thunder, shine, water, reef, air, whirlwind, ice, sand, lava (fire), (even bone), or metal, and adopts the natural physics of those materials; using them as unlimited powers to challenge and kill Max Steel.
 Psychobots - Created by Psycho (who does not appear in Turbo Missions himself), are an army of battle androids with a general appearance that reassembles their creator. All of them are identical, and mostly brainless tools whose only mission is to take revenge for Psycho's death.
 Extroyer (voiced by Brian Drummond and Scott McNeil) - Troy Winter, a special agent and mercenary hired by Eclipse who can match Max's enhanced abilities without effort. Troy suffered a chemical disease with a jewel fragment from Morphosos Comet which transformed him into a crystal monster who can absorb other people's life force and identity, and in the particular case of superhuman entities, their respective powers. He can temporarily morph into any beast he touches and absorbs their powers and savagery (used to combat Max in many episodes). In Turbo Missions he often appears in human form, in events previous to his transformation.
 ToxZon (voiced by Colin Murdock) - Titus Octavius Xander, (friendly nicknamed "Tox" by his initials), once a former N-Tek Agent who due to his scorn for rules, forced a toxic waste disposal machine to run at full capacity before testing it, without any safety measures on, resulting in a major explosion which poisoned and mutated his own body, forcing him to wear armor to keep his body from failing in a clean environment. Vengeful and angry at N-Tek for his condition, ToxZon now uses his new powers to poison and pollute the world. He can absorb various forms of poisons, toxins, chemicals, and nuclear and radioactive waste to empower himself and project as his foes and create creatures called "toxoids" that feed on chemical waste (oil, smog, toxic materials. etc) with various powers.
 Makino - Mike Nickelson, an arrogant and vain news reporter suffered a mutation due to contamination caused by a venomous cloud created during a battle between Max Steel and several of his deadliest enemies. He directly blames N-Tek for his current condition, which gives him the appearance of a warmonger, although he uses a digital clone of himself with his previous normal appearance when he broadcast news. Makino can control any machine or computer by projecting orange electricity from his body, can hyper-compress machinery or computers and add them to his body, and can partially transform into a machine (plane, mechanical claw, tank, submarine, etc.). Since he is still part human, has the weakness of any normal person, and needs to eat, sleep and breathe like any other living being, but also has more resistance and tolerance to pain thanks to his mechanical parts. He has the same nanotechnology N-Tek developed to hyper-compress spy equipment and weapons, so he can match any gadget Max has, but with the additional advantage since these are an integral part of his body. Officially, Makino substitutes Psycho as the main "cyborg enemy" of Max Steel in the series.

Episodes

Season One (2008) 
Season One premiered on Latin America in June 2008. Has a total of 14 episodes, 1 minute length each. Episode 12:"Relaunch" is a complete description of how Max Steel's new 09 Going Turbo Upgrade'' will work for upcoming movies and series episodes.

 Boiling Point - Pilot
 Relax
 Black Hawk down
 The Duel
 Gorilla attack
 Handle with care
 Enemy in home
 Hurricane
 Catch the prey
 The race
 The right gadget
 Relaunch
 Turbulence
 Warming up

 Season Two (2009) 
The Season Two of Turbo Missions was released in June 2009, a year after the first one. It has 12 episodes. The main difference compared to Season One is that it was divided into three separated themes: Animal Encounter, High Voltage and N-Tek Invasion. While (as the previous season) the episodes are independent and have no specific order or continuity, each one showcases only those elements related to their theme.Animal EncounterMostly wilderness and animal adventures, often focused on Extroyer or extroyed animals.
 All Teed Up
 Along Came a Spider
 Goin' BattyHigh VoltageExtreme sports themed adventures, with Elementor as the main villain.
 Powersurge
 The Maze
 Flushed
 Desert StormN-Tek InvasionAn "anything goes" series of episodes, all taking place in N-Tek headquarters, featuring several enemies focused on breaking in to steal N-Tek's technology.
 Uninvited
 Swingtime
 Spaced out
 Mission Critical Gear
 Goin' up

 Season Three (2010) 
The third season was gradually revealed to the public as part of the toy line first, while the videos were not available until June 2010. In 2009 Christmas, few selected toy stores distributed a limited amount of toys from the upcoming 2010 line, including two different ToxZon action figures. Same as the second series, the toys were separated in three different missions. Mattel briefly leaked a couple of episodes on YouTube to test the fan's initial reaction, but the main premiere was during the theatrical release of Toy Story 3 on selected theaters on Latin America. Before the main presentation, a Max Steel vs Psycho droids and Elementor sneak peek episode was presented to the audience.Bio-ThreatAdventures which involved some sort of chemical contamination, with ToxZon or his toxoids as the source of contamination.
 Endangered
 Fusion
 Makin' EarthquakesCyber-attackHigh-tech and robotic adventures, mostly as the previous "N-Tek Invasion" theme of season 2 but with a twist: instead of trying to get into N'Tek's headquarters, captured villains try to get out of the compound.
 Steel vs steel
 Extroyed raven
 Chemical discharge
 Multiple armorsNight StrikeAs the name implies, adventures that takes place at night, mostly in total darkness. (Night Strike action figures glows in the dark).
 Werewolf
 Extreme vision
 Hawk eye

 Season Four: "N-Tek Adventures" (2011) 
For the new season, the name was changed to "N-Tek Adventures." Contrary to previous seasons, this one was not released on DVD.Extreme Terrain City on Fire
 Running Hot
 Live BaitAir Assault Soft Landing
 Winged Fury
 Unfriendly Skies
 Air SprayChemical Chaos'''
 Water Hazard
 Short Fuse
 Gone Fishin'
 Hurrican't

References

External links
 
 Max Steel at Disney XD.com
 

2008 American television series debuts
2011 American television series endings
2000s American animated television series
2010s American animated television series
2008 Canadian television series debuts
2011 Canadian television series endings
2000s Canadian animated television series
2010s Canadian animated television series
American children's animated superhero television series
American computer-animated television series
Canadian children's animated superhero television series
Canadian computer-animated television series
Max Steel
Television series by Sony Pictures Television
Television shows based on Mattel toys
Fictional super soldiers
Espionage television series